Freemansburg is an unincorporated community in Lewis County, West Virginia, United States.

The community was named after the local Freeman family.

References 

Unincorporated communities in West Virginia
Unincorporated communities in Lewis County, West Virginia